Conus darkini is a species of sea snail, a marine gastropod mollusk in the family Conidae, the cone snails and their allies.

Like all species within the genus Conus, these snails are predatory and venomous. They are capable of "stinging" humans, therefore live ones should be handled carefully or not at all.

Description
The size of the shell varies between 34 mm and 87 mm.

Distribution
This marine species occurs off the Philippines, New Caledonia and the Loyalty Islands.

References

 Röckel, D., Korn, W. & Richard, G., 1993. Conus darkini n. sp.. La Conchiglia 267: 48–49
 Tucker J.K. & Tenorio M.J. (2009) Systematic classification of Recent and fossil conoidean gastropods. Hackenheim: Conchbooks. 296 pp. 
 Monnier E., Limpalaër L., Robin A. & Roux C. (2018). A taxonomic iconography of living Conidae. Harxheim: ConchBooks. 2 vols. 1205 pp.page(s): 347
 Puillandre N., Duda T.F., Meyer C., Olivera B.M. & Bouchet P. (2015). One, four or 100 genera? A new classification of the cone snails. Journal of Molluscan Studies. 81: 1–23

External links
 The Conus Biodiversity website
 Cone Shells – Knights of the Sea
 
 Holotype in MNHN, Paris

darkini
Gastropods described in 1993